Robert Cummings (1910–1990) was an American film and television actor.  

Bobby or Robert Cummings may also refer to:

Sportsmen
Robert Cummings (rowing) (1899–1969), Australian champion coxswain at 1924 Summer Olympics
Bobby Cummings (1935–2008), English footballer who played as centre forward or outside right
Robert Cummings (footballer) (born 1969), Australian rules footballer

Others
Robert Cummings (politician) (1833–1910), Canadian manufacturer and community leader
Robert Cummings (1865–1949), American stage leading man and film character actor (1914's The Jungle)
Robert Cummings Neville (born 1939), American systematic philosopher and theologian
Robert Bartleh Cummings (born 1965), American singer, songwriter, filmmaker and voice actor, legal name Rob Zombie

See also
Robert Cumming (disambiguation)